Sepidar Rural District is in Armand District of Khanmirza County, Chaharmahal and Bakhtiari province, Iran. At the censuses of 2006, 2011, and 2016, its constituent parts were in Armand Rural District of the Central District of Lordegan County.

After the census, Khanmirza District and Armand Rural District combined to form the new Khanmirza County. Sepidar Rural District is one of two in the newly established Armand District. The center of the rural district is the village of Shahrak-e Sunk, whose population in 2016 was 1,602.

References 

Khanmirza County

Rural Districts of Chaharmahal and Bakhtiari Province

Populated places in Chaharmahal and Bakhtiari Province

Populated places in Khanmirza County

fa:دهستان سپیدار (خانمیرزا)